Super Machi is a 2022 Indian Telugu-language romantic comedy-drama film written and directed by debutant Puli Vasu. Produced by Rizwan Entertainment, it stars Kalyaan Dhev and Rachita Ram (her Telugu debut) while Rajendra Prasad, Naresh and Posani Krishna Murali play supporting roles. The title is inspired by the song of the same name from S/O Satyamurthy. The film began its production in early 2019 but was delayed by the COVID-19 pandemic. Super Machi was released theatrically on 14 January 2022, coinciding with the festival of Sankranti.

Plot

Cast 
 Kalyaan Dhev as Raju
 Rachita Ram as Meenakshi
 Rajendra Prasad
 Naresh
 Posani Krishna Murali
 Pragathi
 Ajay
 Jabardasth Mahesh
 Satya
 Bhadram
 Prudhvi Raj

Production and release 
Super Machi is the second film of Kalyaan Dhev, ex-son-in-law of Chiranjeevi. It is directed by debutant Puli Vasu with music composed by S. Thaman. Initially, Rhea Chakraborty was signed as the female lead. However, she was later replaced by Kannada actress Rachita Ram who makes her Telugu debut. The film began its production in early 2019 but was put on hold due to major changes in the script. Production resumed in November 2019, but was halted again in March 2020 due to COVID-19 lockdown in India. The final schedule of the film began in June 2021 at Ramanaidu Studios, Hyderabad.

The film was planned to simultaneously release in Kannada with the title This Property Belongs to Meenakshi, however, the Kannada version was subsequently dropped. After several delays, the film was released theatrically on 14 January 2022, coinciding with the festival of Sankranti.

Soundtrack 
The soundtrack album consists of five songs composed by S. Thaman, and released by Aditya Music.

Reception 
The Times of India rated the film 2.75/5 and wrote, "Super Machi is an emotional suspense drama with a pure love story, which will appeal to the youth. Kalyaan Dhev's sincere performance and good drama in the first half are basic assets." A reviewer from Sakshi appreciated the director for bringing novelty in a routine storyline but opined that the emotional scenes in the latter half were poorly executed. Raju Aithagoni of Asianet News also echoed the same while praising the film's climax.

Praveen Kumar Vadla of News18 Telugu felt that it was part-emotional and part-confusing, rating it 2.5/5. Pinkvilla Bhavan Sharma, who rated the film 1.5/5, stated that it was entertaining in bits and pieces. "On the whole, this romantic drama fails to engage as it lacks a strong point to make the film interesting," she concluded.

References

External links 

 

2022 directorial debut films
2022 romantic comedy-drama films
Indian romantic comedy-drama films
Films scored by Thaman S
Films shot in Hyderabad, India
Films set in Hyderabad, India
Films set in Visakhapatnam
Film productions suspended due to the COVID-19 pandemic
2020s Telugu-language films